Lisa Reagan Love  (born c. 1956) is a singer, composer, pianist, musician, and former Miss Oklahoma from Oklahoma City and Nichols Hills, Oklahoma.

Love attended Oklahoma City University, where obtained her bachelor's degree in voice and piano, and went on to earn a master's degree in opera and vocal performance from the University of Maryland's Opera Studio. Love is a former Miss Oklahoma 1975 who has shared the stage with nationally renowned performers such as Plácido Domingo, Luciano Pavarotti, and Renee Fleming. She was a resident member of the Washington National Opera from 1989 to 2008.

Her most recent album “If Thoughts Could Tell” is a remake of some of her favorite songs from the 1970’s. Before that album she composed and co-produced Realm of Dreams, which was recorded at Ocean Way Nashville recording studio with the production team of Fred Cannon and Paul Buono. Previous albums include: Satori (2002), Arcana (2006), and Noel (2012). Her original composition, “A l’infini,” appeared on the season one finale of the Bravo Network reality television series Project Runway in 2005. In 2013, she performed at the Salzburg Music Festival in Austria.

Love has been voice professor at Oklahoma City University in the Wanda L. Bass School of Music and Shenandoah Conservatory of Music.

She was previously married to Oklahoma congressman Mickey Edwards.  She is presently married to Greg Love, Chairman for the Oklahoma Department of Transportation Commission and Co-CEO of Love's Travel Stops, one of America's largest privately-owned companies.

Lisa Reagan is a distant relative of former President Ronald Reagan,

References

External links
 Lisareagan.com bio
 Lisa Reagan Love bio at Creative and Dreams Music Network

Living people
Year of birth missing (living people)
20th-century American musicians
20th-century classical pianists
American women singers
Miss America 1976 delegates
Oklahoma City University alumni
Opera crossover singers
Reagan family
Singers from Oklahoma
Songwriters from Oklahoma
University of Maryland, College Park alumni
20th-century American women musicians
20th-century women pianists